Mayaca is a genus of flowering plants, often placed in its own family, the Mayacaceae (or Mayaceae in earlier systems). In the APG II system of 2003, it is assigned to the order Poales in the clade commelinids. The Cronquist system, of 1981, also recognised such a family and placed it in the order Commelinales in the subclass Commelinidae.

The group is widely distributed in Latin America from Mexico to Argentina, as well as in the West Indies, the southeastern United States, and central Africa.

Species
Eighteen or so species names have been proposed, but only 5 are accepted as distinct. 
 Mayaca baumii Gürke - Congo-Brazzabille, Zaïre, Angola, Zambia
 Mayaca fluviatilis Aubl. - southeastern United States from Texas to North Carolina; West Indies (Cuba, Jamaica, Trinidad); Latin America from central Mexico to Argentina
 Mayaca kunthii Seub.  - Venezuela, Brazil, Uruguay
 Mayaca longipes Mart. ex Seub. - Venezuela, Brazil, Colombia, the Guianas
 Mayaca sellowiana Kunth - Costa Rica, Venezuela, Brazil, Colombia, the Guianas, Peru, Ecuador, Bolivia, Argentina

References

External links
 Mayacaceae in L. Watson and M.J. Dallwitz (1992 onwards). The families of flowering plants: descriptions, illustrations, identification, information retrieval. Version: 27 April 2006. http://delta-intkey.com . 
 Mayacaceae in the Flora of North America
 NCBI Taxonomy Browser
 links at CSDL

Poales genera
Poales